New Castle Lachlan, is an 18th-century baronial mansion or country house located at Strathlachlan, Cowal peninsula, Argyll and Bute, Scotland. It was built in 1790 by Donald Maclachlan, 19th laird, to replace the 15th century Old Castle Lachlan, which stands nearby on the shores of Loch Fyne. The building is protected as a category C listed building.

The building was remodelled around 1910 by the architect George Mackie Watson.

See also
 Old Castle Lachlan

References

External links

Castle Lachlan Estate

Houses completed in 1790
Castles in Argyll and Bute
Category C listed buildings in Argyll and Bute
Country houses in Argyll and Bute
Listed houses in Scotland
Cowal